At the 2002 Winter Olympics held in Salt Lake City, allegations arose that the pairs' figure skating competition had been fixed. The controversy led to two pairs teams receiving gold medals: the original winners Elena Berezhnaya and Anton Sikharulidze of Russia and original silver-medalists Jamie Salé and David Pelletier of Canada. The scandal was one of the causes for the revamp of scoring in figure skating to the new ISU Judging System.

Competition
In the figure skating pairs competition, Elena Berezhnaya and Anton Sikharulidze of Russia won the short program over Jamie Salé and David Pelletier of Canada. During the short program, Salé and Pelletier had tripped and fallen on their closing pose. Because the fall was not on an element, it did not receive a deduction, but it marred the program enough to land the pair in second place behind Berezhnaya and Sikharulidze.

In the free skate, Berezhnaya and Sikharulidze made a minor, yet obvious, technical error when Sikharulidze stepped out of a double Axel. Salé and Pelletier performed a free skate program to "Love Story" which they had used in previous seasons and that had been well received at the Grand Prix Final before the Olympics. They skated a flawless program, albeit one that some experts considered to be of lesser difficulty than that of the Russians. 

Based on the 6.0 system of scoring in use, Salé and Pelletier received 5.9s and 5.8s for technical merit, while the Russians had received mostly 5.8s and 5.7s. However, the Canadians received only four 5.9s for presentation, versus the Russians' seven. Presentation was weighted in the total score more strongly than technical merit, so the Canadians had needed at least five 5.9s in presentation to overtake the Russians for first. Since they did not receive that many, the Canadians were ranked second, and Berezhnaya and Sikharulidze took the gold.

Judges and officials

Breakdown of marks
{|  class="wikitable"
|-
! Berezhnaya & Sikharulidze
! RUS
! CHN
! USA
! FRA
! POL
! CAN
! UKR
! GER
! JPN
|-
| Technical merit  || 5.8 ||  5.8  || 5.7  || 5.8 ||  5.7  || 5.7  || 5.8 ||  5.8  || 5.7 
|-
| Presentation || 5.9 ||  5.9 ||  5.9   ||  5.9  ||  5.9  || 5.8  || 5.9  || 5.8  || 5.9 
|-
| Placement || 1 ||  1 ||  2  || 1  || 1  || 2  || 1  || 2 ||  2 
|-
! Salé & Pelletier
! RUS
! CHN
! USA
! FRA
! POL
! CAN
! UKR
! GER
! JPN
|-
| Technical merit  || 5.8  || 5.9  || 5.8  || 5.8  || 5.8|| 5.9 ||5.8  || 5.9 ||  5.8 
|-
| Presentation ||5.8 ||  5.8 ||  5.9  || 5.8  || 5.8  || 5.9  || 5.8  || 5.9 ||  5.9 
|-
| Placement || 2 ||  2 ||  1  ||2  ||  2 ||  1  || 2  || 1  || 1 
|}

Scandal
During the live broadcast, both the American and Canadian television commentators (NBC Sports' Tom Hammond, Scott Hamilton, and Sandra Bezic and CBC Sports' Chris Cuthbert, Paul Martini, and Barbara Underhill) proclaimed that Salé and Pelletier had won the gold as they finished their program, believing their performances to be superior to the Russians. Subsequently, they expressed outrage when the judges' marks were announced.

Suspicions were rapidly raised of cheating in the scoring. Judges from Russia, the People's Republic of China, Poland, Ukraine, and France had placed the Russians first; judges from the United States, Canada, Germany, and Japan chose the Canadians.

The French judge, Marie-Reine Le Gougne, quickly attracted suspicion.  When Le Gougne returned to the officials' hotel, Sally Stapleford, chair of the International Skating Union's Technical Committee, confronted her. Le Gougne was upset and allegedly said that she had been pressured by Didier Gailhaguet, the head of the French national skating federation, to vote for the Russian pair regardless of how the others performed. She reportedly repeated this at the post-event judges' meeting the next day. It was alleged that this was part of a deal to get an advantage for the French team of Marina Anissina and Gwendal Peizerat in the ice dance competition that was to follow a few days later. However, Le Gougne later submitted a signed statement in which she denied taking part in such a deal, and also said that she had truly believed the Russian pair deserved to win the gold.

Immediate aftermath
The Canadian press and public were outraged by the result. The American press were also quick to support the Canadian pair. NBC, in particular, continued to report on the story and support the Canadians' cause.

Some in the United States and many in Russia, however, felt that Berezhnaya and Sikharulidze had deserved their win, and that it should not be marred by the alleged dishonesty of a single judge. 

Sikharulidze contrasted these events to the reactions to Salé and Pelletier's win at the 2001 World Championships, held in Canada. The Canadians were awarded gold despite Salé falling on the triple toe loop in the short program and changing her planned double Axel to a single Axel in the long program. Points were deducted for both errors.

In response to Canadian and American outcry, International Skating Union (ISU) President Ottavio Cinquanta announced in a press conference a day after the competition that the ISU would conduct an "internal assessment" into the judging decision at its next scheduled council meeting. After many hostile questions from the press, Cinquanta acknowledged that the event referee, Ronald Pfenning, had filed an official complaint about the judging. Later, on February 13, International Olympic Committee (IOC) Director-General François Carrard held a press conference in which he publicly urged the ISU to resolve the matter as quickly as possible.

On February 15, Cinquanta and IOC President Jacques Rogge, in a joint press conference, announced that Salé and Pelletier's silver medals would be upgraded to gold. Berezhnaya and Sikharulidze were to keep their gold medals as well, since there was no evidence of wrongdoing on their part. Four of the nine judges on the panel felt they deserved it. Both pairs' point totals were thrown out. 

For the first time in history, the awards ceremony was repeated. Berezhnaya and Sikharulidze attended, but the bronze medalists, Shen Xue and Zhao Hongbo of China, refused.

Post-Olympics aftermath
On April 30, 2002, the ISU announced that Le Gougne and Gailhaguet were suspended for three years for their roles in the scandal and also prohibited from attending the 2006 Winter Olympics. Although at least one eye-witness to Le Gougne's outburst in the hotel lobby reported that she had specifically confessed to a deal with the Russians, Cinquanta claimed there was no evidence that the Russians were involved in the incident. The ISU never made any serious investigation of their alleged involvement.

On July 31, 2002, Italian authorities in Venice arrested Russian organized crime boss Alimzhan Tokhtakhounov on U.S. charges that he masterminded the fix at the Olympics. He was released from Italian police custody without being charged, amidst attempts to have him extradited to the United States in 2002–2003.

In 2004, The ISU voted to change the 6.0 judging system because it was considered to be too subjective. As a result, the International Judging System (IJS) was created to score a skater based on the technological grade of execution of the elements and gives a true numerical, mathematical score.

In addition to disciplining Le Gougne and Gailhaguet, in 2002 the ISU adopted a policy of secret judging as part of a new system for figure skating. Judges' marks are posted anonymously, as part of the new ISU Judging System for figure skating. While the ISU claimed this secrecy freed judges from pressure from their federations, critics noted that, instead of preventing judges from cheating, secrecy prevented the public and media from being able to identify cheating. Following the 2014 Sochi Olympics, the ISU Congress changed this policy, and ended anonymous judging to "increase transparency" in the process.

In March 2003, a group of skating officials who were unhappy with the ISU's leadership and handling of the crisis in the sport announced the formation of the World Skating Federation. Their attempt to take control of competitive figure skating away from the ISU failed. TSU or their respective national federations banished several of the persons involved with establishing the new federation from the sport of ice skating. Those banned included Ronald Pfenning, referee of the pairs competition at the Salt Lake City Olympics; Sally Stapleford; Jon Jackson; and other witnesses to Le Gougne's outburst.

Documentary
In early 2022, former skater Tara Lipinski and her husband Todd Kapostasy (a producer of sports documentaries) were co-producers of the 4-part docu-series titled Meddling, which studied the 2002 skating controversy at the Salt Lake City Olympics. It was broadcast on NBC subsidiaries.

In 2021, one of the episodes of Netflix documentary series Bad Sport showcases this controversial event.

See also 
 ISU Judging System

References

Further reading

External links 
 Jamie Salé and David Pelletier 2002 Olympic Free Program with scoring reactions (video) at YouTube
 Official free skate results before the second gold was awarded
 Official overall results before the second gold was awarded

scandal
Olympic Games controversies
Olympic Winter Games Figure Skating Scandal, 2002
2002 scandals